The Riches (styled as the Ri¢hes) is an American television drama which was originally broadcast from March 12, 2007, to April 29, 2008, on FX. The series stars Eddie Izzard and Minnie Driver as members of a family of Irish Travellers who "steal the American dream" by stealing the home and identities of a wealthy dead couple. The series received positive reviews but was cancelled after two seasons.

History
Originally named Low Life, the show was created and head written by Dmitry Lipkin for Maverick Films and FX Networks. The one-hour pilot was written by Lipkin and Eddie Izzard, and directed by Carl Franklin. The pilot was then rethought and reshot over 10 days by Peter O'Fallon. It first aired on March 12, 2007, followed by a further 12 episodes. Additionally, the first two episodes were made available on the Internet prior to their television air dates. FX announced on May 8, 2007, that The Riches would return for a second season, the first episode of which aired on March 18, 2008. The second season ran for 7 episodes.
FX President John Landgraf described The Riches as a "family show", albeit one featuring "a family unlike any television viewers have seen before".

The second season was affected by the 2007–08 Writers Guild of America strike and was abruptly cut short. Several months after the season ended, the show was cancelled, with FX blaming a drop in ratings. In 2019, Minnie Driver lamented the cancellation, and wrote that the show was "cancelled in the wake of punitive measures taken against writers who were vocal in the writers strike".

Plot
The show features Izzard and Driver as Wayne and Dahlia Malloy who, along with their family, are Irish Traveller con artists and thieves. They travel with their children Di Di (Delilah), Cael, and Sam.

As the series begins, Dahlia has just been paroled from prison. During her 2-year sentence, she has developed various drug addictions. In her absence, Wayne and the children have been continuing to act as con artists across the U.S. After a brief reunion with their Traveller clan, the family flees to avoid an arranged marriage for Di Di. Wayne steals a large amount from the clan's hoard of cash, and the family runs off. After getting into an altercation and RV chase with another Traveller family, the Malloys are involved in a car accident that kills a very wealthy couple, the eponymous Riches. In the hopes of pursuing a "better life", they decide to "steal the American dream" and adopt the Riches' identities in an affluent gated community in Baton Rouge, Louisiana. They struggle to adjust to their new lives as buffers, as they call people who are not Travellers.

Cast and characters

 Wayne Malloy (Eddie Izzard) – Wayne is the paternal head of the Malloy family (not to be confused with the extended Malloy 'clan'). He is a consummate, intelligent grifter and thief who experienced an 'existential crisis' while his wife was serving time in prison. He has become disillusioned with the nomadic, scamming lifestyle of the Travellers; it was his idea to steal the identities of deceased Doug and Cherien Rich and settle down into a normal life. Dahlia has referred to him as a 'halfbreed' or 'half buffer', because he did not come from a Traveller bloodline.
 Dahlia Malloy (Minnie Driver) – Dahlia is Wayne's newly paroled wife. Her behavior is erratic and unpredictable, exacerbated by drug habits picked up in prison. A recovering methamphetamine addict, Dahlia imbibed a wide array of legal and illegal drugs since her parole, but recently she appears to be trying to get clean. Dahlia is considered 'royalty' in their Traveller clan, and her connection to the clan (both by blood and ideology) appears to be much stronger than Wayne's. She was initially very skeptical of Wayne's plan to leave their old lifestyle and impersonate the Riches and has struggled to live as Cherien Rich.
 Cael Malloy (Noel Fisher) – Cael is the eldest Malloy son. He is quiet and intelligent. His skills include carrying out petty cash-register cons, faking epileptic seizures, picking locks, creating fake identity documents, disabling alarm systems, and stealing cars. While his sister Di Di is more supportive of their father, Cael is more supportive of their mother and the traditional Traveller lifestyle and beliefs. Likewise, his reception to the "Rich" lifestyle is less enthusiastic than that of his ambitious father and siblings.
 Delilah "Di Di" Malloy (Shannon Marie Woodward) – Di Di is the adolescent daughter of Wayne and Dahlia. Like her siblings she is intelligent, crafty, and adept at various scams and thievery. In the pilot's opening scene she is seen pickpocketing people at a high-school class reunion while Wayne distracts them. Di Di's relationship with her mother appears to be strained; at one point when angered, she lies to her mother about sleeping with her boyfriend Erick. When it temporarily seemed the family would split up, Di Di chose to stay with her father. She embraced the Riches' way of life and no longer seems interested in the Traveller lifestyle.
 Sam Malloy (Aidan Mitchell) – Sam, the youngest Malloy child, is gender non-conforming, and frequently dresses in feminine clothing. The idea for Sam's non-binary gender expression came about before Izzard—a gender non-conforming comedian—joined the show. Sam's gender expression is accepted and respected by their parents and siblings. On their first night in the Rich home, Sam draws a large mural on a bedroom wall depicting the family's recent adventures, including the car accident and Dahlia's release from prison. In addition to artistic skill, Sam is interested in French and very earnest about getting a good education. Like the rest of the family, Sam appears to be very clever and adept at trickery. In episode 3, Sam is the key player in an elaborate con of Dahlia's to get the Malloy children into Rosemere Academy. During the season 1 finale, Sam expresses reluctance and even denial in leaving Eden Falls.
 Dale Malloy (Todd Stashwick) – Dale is cousin to Dahlia. He and Wayne were raised like brothers in the Malloy clan. Within the code of the family Dale expected that one day he would marry Dahlia and take his rightful place as head of the family once his father, Earl, died. A borderline sociopath whose life becomes slowly unhinged. Feeling wronged many times over by Wayne he is hell bent on revenge against Wayne and his family. Feeling the pain of his unrequited love and the fact that his father was going to pass the reins of the clan on to Wayne, Dale goes to murderous lengths to protect his legacy. Eventually discovering the Riches' secret, he now finds himself in an unholy alliance with Wayne, leveraging the truth to his selfish needs.

Episodes

Season 1 (2007)
The first season's episodes began airing on March 12, 2007. The pilot episode and episode 1.2 ("Believe the Lie") were made available early for online viewing at MSN, Yahoo!, and TV.com at various times.

Season 2 (2008)
A second season of 13 episodes was announced on May 8, 2007, by FX for broadcast in the first half of 2008. It premiered on March 18, 2008. Due to a long writer's strike, only 7 episodes were produced.

Ratings

The pilot episode of The Riches drew 3.8 million viewers. With 2.5 million of those viewers in the 18–49 demographic, The Riches scored second only to the premiere of The Shield, thus beating out the premieres of other FX dramas such as Rescue Me, Over There, and Dirt. The pilot was also FX's first-ever Sunday night premiere of an original series, and more than doubled the channel's highest-ever ratings for the Sunday 10pm slot. The show averaged 5.9 million cumulative viewers per week in the US, sufficient for FX to commission a second season. The Riches has gained popularity through online resources, such as Hulu and iTunes' "What We Are Watching" for April 2008.

Critical reception
Television critics gave The Riches enthusiastic reviews. The Baltimore Sun described it as "the kind of TV drama that makes one think while being entertained". and The Boston Globe lauded a "layered drama" full of "unexpectedly soulful pleasures". The New York Times wrote that "together, [Izzard and Driver] are superb". Meanwhile, The Los Angeles Times complained that the show lacked originality.

Time magazine's James Poniewozik named it one of the Top 10 New TV Series of 2006, ranking it at #7, while Minnie Driver was nominated for a Primetime Emmy Award and a Golden Globe Award for her performance.

In a review of the second season, The Hollywood Reporter said that "Izzard and Driver remain a joy to watch in this odd but fascinating series that is derivative of nothing on TV", while the San Francisco Chronicle described the second season as "gloriously inventive, daring and provocative".

Home releases

Film
In 2008, Eddie Izzard said that a low-budget Riches movie was being developed, and added "We'll shoot it guerilla-style, using gorillas to actually shoot it. We're going to give them cameras...No, we're going to just get in there and maybe not have permission to do things, but just film it." But the film never materialized.

References

External links

2007 American television series debuts
2008 American television series endings
2000s American comedy-drama television series
2000s American crime drama television series
2000s American LGBT-related drama television series
Baton Rouge, Louisiana
Eddie Izzard
FX Networks original programming
Identity theft
Serial drama television series
Television series about dysfunctional families
Television series by 20th Century Fox Television
Television shows set in Louisiana
Transgender-related television shows
Works about Irish Travellers